The 4 Seasons Greetings is the second studio album by The Four Seasons. It was released in 1962 on Vee-Jay Records as a monophonic recording and later again the same year in stereo.  The album charted for 6 weeks on Billboards Best Bets For Christmas album chart peaking at #28 on December 18, 1965.

Side one features traditional carols, while the second side contains their contemporary, rock and pop flourishes. The album was initially reissued in 1966 on Philips Records with a new title, The 4 Seasons' Christmas Album''''', and different cover artwork, and again, on Curb Records in 2002.

Track listing

Personnel
 Frankie Valli – vocals
 Nick Massi – bass guitar, vocal arrangements, vocals
 Bob Gaudio – keyboards, piano, vocals
 Tommy DeVito – lead guitar, vocals

References 

1962 Christmas albums
The Four Seasons (band) albums
Christmas albums by American artists
Albums produced by Bob Crewe
Vee-Jay Records albums
Philips Records albums
Pop rock Christmas albums